The Swan Princess: Christmas is a 2012 American computer-animated fantasy family film directed by Richard Rich, produced by Crest Animation Productions and Nest Family Entertainment. It is the fourth film in The Swan Princess series first in 14 years, and follows the adventures of Odette and Derek celebrating their first Christmas together. While the three previous films in the series were animated using traditional 2D hand-drawn techniques, The Swan Princess Christmas was the first in the series to be created entirely with 3D CGI animation.

Out of all of the cast members James Arrington is the only one to return from the original film and its sequels, Doug Stone reprises his role as Speed from the sequels and Sean Wright reprises his role of Rothbart from The Swan Princess: The Mystery of the Enchanted Kingdom. The movie is followed by a fifth 3D computer-animated direct-to-DVD entitled The Swan Princess: A Royal Family Tale released one year later.

Plot
Princess Odette and Prince Derek are on their way to Queen Uberta's castle to celebrate their first Christmas together. Unbeknownst to them, the evil sorcerer Rothbart has returned from the dead as a spirit and enlisted a black cat named Number 9 for help by promising him nine extra lives. Number 9 lures Derek to the cellar of Uberta's castle where he opens a chest with the initial R on it. When Derek leaves, Rothbart emerges from the chest as a ghost. From here, Rothbart starts his plan to destroy the kingdom's Christmas spirit, the only thing more powerful than the Forbidden Arts, as this will give him the power to be revived in bodily form. Rothbart is able to cast minor spells that cause people to fight; he does this to Queen Uberta and Lord Rogers, and later to the villagers until almost the entire village is in disharmony.

Derek and Odette learn of Rothbart's return as a ghostly spirit when wind chimes playing "Far Longer than Forever" make him visible and hold him immobile. They set up chimes all around the castle, but Rothbart eventually re-enlists the help of Bridget (his hag henchwoman from the first film who had turned good) and she helps remove the wind chimes for him.

As part of the Christmas festivities, Uberta and Rogers are staging musical performances, but because of Rothbart's spell they have become aggressive and competitive with each other. Odette, who is staging her own song, invites the children to perform "Christmas is the Reason" which momentarily weakens Rothbart's power over Uberta and Rogers. Odette follows up on this by inviting Uberta and Rogers to give gifts and food to the poor. This time the good will breaks the spell on the whole kingdom, and Rothbart is severely weakened.

Rothbart's last chance to ruin the kingdom's Christmas spirit is to sabotage the royal Christmas tree. He sends Number 9 to steal one of the Christmas lights, and Rothbart casts a dark spell on it that will destroy the tree. Derek learns of this plan thanks to Bridget, who has double-crossed Rothbart and traps him inside a giant chime.

Derek rushes back to the Christmas Eve party to stop the tree from being lit, but they are too late. The enchanted light bulb bursts the tree and its ornaments into flames. Rothbart becomes fully restored to his physical body, takes Uberta's crown which he turns into his own, and kidnaps Odette where he takes her back to Swan Lake.

At Swan Lake, Rothbart once again turns Odette into a white swan and traps her inside a cage made of roots, just as Speed, Puffin and Jean-Bob arrived. Puffin tries to attack Rothbart, but the evil sorcerer knocks the bird down and turns him into a Christmas ornament. He then casts a spell on the moonlight, so that when it touches Odette's wings, she will turn into a golden swan-shaped ornament forever. Derek arrives to rescue Odette and Rothbart has assumed the form of the Great Animal again to fight Derek. At first Derek is overpowered, but Odette starts singing "The Season of Love," which weakens Rothbart until he bursts into flames and dies. With Rothbart defeated for a second time, Odette changes back into a human and Puffin returns to his normal self. Derek dies in her arms due to his injuries, but a distraught Odette sings again, the great spirit of Christmas returns him to life and restores the royal Christmas Tree. At the Christmas party, the kingdom puts up a new Christmas ornament on the tree, honoring Derek and Odette.

Cast
 Laura Bailey (credited as Elle Deets) as Princess Odette
 Summer Eguchi as her singing voice
 Yuri Lowenthal as Prince Derek
 Michaelangelo as his singing voice 
 Jennifer Miller as Queen Uberta
 Joseph Medrano as Lord Rogers
 Sean Wright as Sir Rothbart
 David Lodge as Number 9 and Footman #1
 Catherine Lavine as Bridget and Village Woman
 James Arrington as Sir Chamberlain
 Clayton James Mackay as Jean-Bob
 Gardner Jaas as Puffin
 Doug Stone as Speed, Sir Peter, and Footman #2
 Joey Lotsko as Bromley, Butler, and Footman #3
 Brian Nissen as Ferdinand the Chef
 Maxine Blue as Wood Cutter's Wife
 G.K. Bowes as Caretaker
 Gabriela Miller as a Girl. 
 Catherine Parks as Maid
 Ashley Spain as a Girl
 Joseph Van de Tacht as a Boy

Music
The film's music was composed by Vassal Benford. Two albums were released in conjunction with the film. A Christmas album, "17 Songs from The Swan Princess Christmas" was released on October 22, 2012, containing the film's Christmas songs and a few instrumental pieces from the film. A more complete soundtrack album, "The Swan Princess Christmas Soundtrack", was released on November 8, 2012, containing 34 tracks of the film's songs and instrumental pieces. Both albums contain a studio version of "Season of Love", Odette's song from the film, performed by Anna Graceman.

Reception

Common Sense Media gave the film 2 out of 5 stars. The website reads, "Animated sequel lacks magic; some mild violence."

See also
 List of Christmas films

References

External links
 

2012 films
2012 direct-to-video films
American children's animated adventure films
American children's animated fantasy films
American fantasy adventure films
2012 animated films
2012 computer-animated films
American Christmas films
Animated Christmas films
2010s ghost films
Animated films about birds
Films about frogs
Films about turtles
Animated films about cats
Films directed by Richard Rich
Direct-to-video sequel films
Direct-to-video animated films
Films set in the Middle Ages
American fantasy comedy films
American animated comedy films
The Swan Princess
Stage 6 Films films
2010s American animated films
Sony Pictures direct-to-video films
2010s children's animated films
2010s children's fantasy films
American ghost films
2010s English-language films
Films with screenplays by Brian Nissen
Films with screenplays by Richard Rich